Aphaenogaster patruelis is a species of ant in the family Formicidae.

Subspecies
These two subspecies belong to the species Aphaenogaster patruelis:
 Aphaenogaster patruelis carbonaria Pergande, 1894 i c g
 Aphaenogaster patruelis patruelis Forel, 1886 i c g
Data sources: i = ITIS, c = Catalogue of Life, g = GBIF, b = Bugguide.net

References

Further reading

External links

 

patruelis
Articles created by Qbugbot
Insects described in 1886